Liminal beings are those that cannot easily be placed into a single category of existence. Associated with the threshold state of liminality, from Latin līmen, "threshold", they represent and highlight the semi-autonomous boundaries of the social world.

Liminal beings are naturally ambiguous, challenging the cultural networks of social classification.

Liminal entities

The cultural anthropologist Victor Turner considered that liminal entities, such as those undergoing initiation rites, often appeared in the form of monsters, so as to represent the co-presence of opposites—high/low; good/bad—in the liminal experience.

Liminal personas are structurally and socially invisible, having left one set of classifications and not yet entered another. The social anthropologist Mary Douglas has highlighted the dangerous aspects of such liminal beings, but they are also potentially beneficent. Thus we often find presiding over a ritual's liminal stage a semi-human shaman figure, or a powerful mentor with animal aspects, such as a centaur.

Legendary

By extension, liminal beings of a mixed, hybrid nature appear regularly in myth, legend and fantasy. A legendary liminal being is a legendary creature that combines two distinct states of simultaneous existence within one physical body. This unique perspective may provide the liminal being with wisdom and the ability to instruct, making them suitable mentors, whilst also making them dangerous and uncanny.

Many beings in fantasy and folklore exist in liminal states impossible in actual beings:

Hybrids (two species):

 Centaurs from classical mythology, among them Chiron, the mentor of Achilles
Tritons from classical mythology, half-human sea beasts
Satyrs and their elder counterparts the Silenoi from classical mythology, half-man half-goat (similar to the Roman Faun)
Harpies from classical mythology, half-woman half-bird (see also: Furies)
 Cynocephali, dog-headed humans
 Yali (Hindu mythology)
 'A liminal figure, like the Sphinx...straddling the divide between animal and human, and partaking of both'.

Both human and spirit by blood:
 Merlin is a cambion, the son of a woman and an incubus
 Caliban in William Shakespeare's play The Tempest
 Abe no Seimei, legendarily attributed a human father but a kitsune (fox spirit) mother

Both human and vegetable:
 the Green Man

Both alive and dead:
 ghosts, among them Tiresias, the dead seer whom Odysseus consulted in the underworld, in the Odyssey. Tiresias also had been transformed into a woman and back into a man while living, and was blind as well as a seer.
Both human and machine:
 In science fiction, liminal beings include cyborgs, such as the Six Million Dollar Man and Seven of Nine from Star Trek.
Both human and alien:
 hybrids or adoptives torn between their human and alien natures, such as Spock from Star Trek or Valentine Michael Smith from Stranger in a Strange Land.

Both human beings as well as deities:
 Jesus Christ

See also

References

Further reading
John Clute and John Grant, The Encyclopedia of Fantasy

External links
 Allison Wright, 'liminal, liminality'
 Liminal beings: Indian mythology

Fantasy tropes
Mythological archetypes